Sophie Friederike Dinglinger (1736–1791) was a German painter.

Life and work
Born in Dresden, Dinglinger was the daughter of goldsmith Johann Friedrich Dinglinger, and granddaughter of the better known goldsmith Johann Melchior Dinglinger. She studied with Adam Friedrich Oeser. She invented a method to fix pastel to paper which was used by, among others, Dora Stock; this appears to have allowed the use of deeper colors and a naturalistic treatment of fabric. She produced miniature paintings and pastels during her career. Henriette-Félicité Tassaert lived with Dinglinger during the start of her sojourn in Dresden.

References

1736 births
1791 deaths
18th-century German painters
18th-century German women artists
German women painters
Pastel artists
Artists from Dresden
Portrait miniaturists